Lafayette Township is one of fourteen townships in Madison County, Indiana, United States. As of the 2010 census, its population was 5,275 and it contained 2,379 housing units.

Lafayette Township was organized in 1836.

Geography

Cities, towns, villages
 Anderson (north edge)
 Frankton (south half)

Unincorporated towns
 Florida at 
 Linwood at 
 North Anderson at 
 Prosperity at 
(This list is based on USGS data and may include former settlements.)

Cemeteries
The township contains Independent Order of Odd Fellows Cemetery.

Major highways
  Indiana State Road 9

Airports and landing strips
 H and R Skylane Airport

Education
 Anderson Community School Corporation
 Frankton-Lapel Community Schools

Lafayette Township residents may obtain a free library card from the North Madison County Public Library System with branches in Elwood, Frankton, and Summitville.

Political districts
 Indiana's 6th congressional district
 State House District 36
 State Senate District 25

References
 
 United States Census Bureau 2008 TIGER/Line Shapefiles
 IndianaMap

External links
 Indiana Township Association
 United Township Association of Indiana
 City-Data.com page for Lafayette Township
 Lafayette Township history

Townships in Madison County, Indiana
Townships in Indiana